"Da Strike" is a song by Swedish punk rock band Millencolin from the album Tiny Tunes (later re-released as Same Old Tunes). It was released as a single on 16 December 1994 by Burning Heart Records, including two B-sides from the album's recording sessions, "Softworld" and "Niap", along with a live recording of "Shake Me". "Niap" is a re-recording of the song "Pain" from the band's first EP Use Your Nose. "Softworld" reappeared on the band's next album Life on a Plate, while "Niap" and the live version of "Shake Me" were re-released in 1999 on the compilation album The Melancholy Collection. An accompanying music video for "Da Strike" was also filmed and released. "Da Strike" also appeared in the game ESPN X Games Pro Boarder for the PS1.

Track listing
CD single
"Da Strike"
"Softworld"
"Shake Me" (live)
"Niap"

7" vinyl
Side A:
"Da Strike"
"Softworld"
Side B:
"Shake Me" (live)
"Niap"

Personnel

Millencolin
Nikola Sarcevic - lead vocals, bass
Erik Ohlsson - guitar
Mathias Färm - guitar
Fredrik Larzon - drums

Additional musicians
Fredrik Folcke - saxophone

References

Millencolin songs
1994 debut singles
Burning Heart Records singles
1994 songs
Songs written by Mathias Färm
Songs written by Nikola Šarčević
Songs written by Fredrik Larzon
Songs written by Erik Ohlsson (musician)